Dioptis longipennis is a moth of the family Notodontidae first described by William Schaus in 1913. It is found in Costa Rica, Panama and Nicaragua.

The larvae feed on Asterogyne, Calyptrogyne, Geonoma and Prestoea species.

References

Moths described in 1913
Notodontidae